"Mistaneek" is an electronic world music song performed by the Belgian singer Natacha Atlas. It was written by Hamid Mantu, Kamel El Habchi, Atlas and Tim Whelan and produced by Transglobal Underground for Atlas' third album Gedida (1999).

Formats and track listings
CD single
 "Mistaneek"
 "Bastet" (Bullitnuts remix)

French CD single
 "Mistaneek (Je T'attends)" featuring Sawt El Atlas 
 "Mistaneek (Je T'attends)" featuring Sawt El Atlas (Edit) 
 "Mistaneek" (Un Cadeau Pour Natacha)

External links
Official website

1999 singles
Electronic songs
Natacha Atlas songs
1999 songs
Songs written by Natacha Atlas